Giarabub is a 1942 Italian war film directed by Goffredo Alessandrini and starring Carlo Ninchi, Mario Ferrari and Doris Duranti. The film was a propaganda work which portrayed the Siege of Giarabub (1940–41) during the Second World War, in which Italian troops defended Jaghbub, Libya for nine months against British forces.

Partial Cast
 Carlo Ninchi as Il maggiore Castagna
 Mario Ferrari as Il capitano Del Grande  
 Doris Duranti as Dolores 
 Carlo Romano as Il maresciallo Romano  
 Annibale Betrone as Il dottor Alberti  
 Elio Steiner as Il tenente Negri  
 Erminio Spalla as Il meccanico "Mago Bakù" Brambilla 
 Corrado De Cenzo as Il capitano De Cenzo  
 Guido Notari as Il maggiore Squillace 
 Mario Liberati as Il telegrafista Liberati  
 Nico Pepe as Il tenente Corsi 
 Emilio Cigoli as Il maggiore John Williams

References

Bibliography 
 Gundle, Stephen. Mussolini's Dream Factory: Film Stardom in Fascist Italy. Berghahn Books, 2013.

External links 
 

1942 films
Italian war films
1942 war films
1940s Italian-language films
Films directed by Goffredo Alessandrini
World War II films made in wartime
Films set in 1940
Films set in 1941
Films set in Libya
North African campaign films
Italian black-and-white films
Films scored by Renzo Rossellini
Italian World War II films
1940s Italian films